Patrick H. O'Connell (June 10, 1861 – January 24, 1943) was an American professional baseball center fielder. He played for the Baltimore Orioles of the American Association during the 1886 baseball season. He continued to play in the minor leagues through 1895. He is buried in Mount Hope Cemetery in Lewiston, Maine.

External links

1861 births
1943 deaths
Baseball players from Maine
Sportspeople from Bangor, Maine
Sportspeople from Lewiston, Maine
Major League Baseball outfielders
Baltimore Orioles (AA) players
19th-century baseball players
Wilmington Blue Hens players
London Tecumsehs (baseball) players
Kalamazoo Kazoos players
Omaha Omahogs players
Omaha Lambs players
Burlington Babies players
Des Moines Prohibitionists players
New Bedford Whalers (baseball) players
Burials in Maine